Caleb John Kilian (born June 2, 1997) is an American professional baseball pitcher for the Chicago Cubs of Major League Baseball (MLB). He made his MLB debut in 2022.

Amateur career
Kilian attended Flower Mound High School in Flower Mound, Texas and played college baseball at Texas Tech University. He was drafted by the Baltimore Orioles in the 20th round of the 2018 Major League Baseball draft but did not sign and returned to Texas Tech. He was then drafted by the San Francisco Giants in the eighth round of the 2019 Major League Baseball draft and signed.

Professional career

San Francisco Giants
Kilian spent his first professional season in 2019 with the Arizona League Giants and Salem-Keizer Volcanoes and did not allow an earned run over 16 innings. Owing to the cancellation of the 2020 Minor League Baseball season because of COVID-19, he did not pitch for a team. He started 2021 with the Eugene Emeralds before being promoted to the Richmond Flying Squirrels.

Chicago Cubs
On July 30, 2021, the San Francisco Giants traded Kilian along with Alexander Canario to the Chicago Cubs in exchange for Kris Bryant. He was assigned to play for the Tennessee Smokies, but missed the final month of the 2021 season due to injury. Over 19 starts between Eugene, Richmond, and Tennessee, he went 7-4 with a 2.42 ERA and 112 strikeouts over  innings. After the season, Kilian played for the Mesa Solar Sox in the Arizona Fall League. He won the AFL Championship Game's MVP Award after throwing six perfect innings, retiring all 18 batters he faced. He opened the 2022 season with the Iowa Cubs.

On June 4, 2022, Kilian was selected to the 40-man roster and promoted to the major leagues for the first time to start against the St. Louis Cardinals.

References

External links

1997 births
Living people
Sportspeople from Anaheim, California
Baseball players from Texas
Major League Baseball pitchers
Chicago Cubs players
Texas Tech Red Raiders baseball players
Arizona League Giants players
Salem-Keizer Volcanoes players
Eugene Emeralds players
Richmond Flying Squirrels players
Tennessee Smokies players
Iowa Cubs players
Mesa Solar Sox players